The Gospel of Luke tells of the origins, birth, ministry, death, resurrection, and ascension of Jesus Christ. Together with the Acts of the Apostles, it makes up a two-volume work which scholars call Luke–Acts, accounting for 27.5% of the New Testament. The combined work divides the history of first-century Christianity into three stages, with the gospel making up the first two of these – the life of Jesus the Messiah from his birth to the beginning of his mission in the meeting with John the Baptist, followed by his ministry with events such as the Sermon on the Plain and its Beatitudes, and his Passion, death, and resurrection. 

Most modern scholars agree that the main sources used for Luke were a), the Gospel of Mark, b), a hypothetical sayings collection called the Q source, and c), material found in no other gospels, often referred to as the L (for Luke) source. The author is anonymous; the traditional view that it was Luke the Evangelist, the companion of Paul, is still occasionally put forward, but the scholarly consensus emphasises the many contradictions between Acts and the authentic Pauline letters. The most probable date for its composition is around AD 80–110, and there is evidence that it was still being revised well into the 2nd century.

Composition

Textual history

Autographs (original copies) of Luke and the other Gospels have not been preserved; the texts that survive are third-generation copies, with no two completely identical. The earliest witnesses (the technical term for written manuscripts) for the Gospel of Luke fall into two "families" with considerable differences between them, the Western and the Alexandrian text-type, and the dominant view is that the Western text represents a process of deliberate revision, as the variations seem to form specific patterns. 

The fragment  is often cited as the oldest witness. It has been dated from the late 2nd century, although this dating is disputed. Papyrus 75 (= Papyrus Bodmer XIV–XV) is another very early manuscript (late 2nd/early 3rd century), and it includes an attribution of the Gospel to Luke. 

The oldest complete texts are the 4th-century Codex Sinaiticus and Vaticanus, both from the Alexandrian family; Codex Bezae, a 5th- or 6th-century Western text-type manuscript that contains Luke in Greek and Latin versions on facing pages, appears to have descended from an offshoot of the main manuscript tradition, departing from more familiar readings at many points. 

Codex Bezae shows comprehensively the differences between the versions which show no core theological significance.

Luke–Acts: unity, authorship and date

The gospel of Luke and the Acts of the Apostles make up a two-volume work which scholars call Luke–Acts. Together they account for 27.5% of the New Testament, the largest contribution by a single author, providing the framework for both the Church's liturgical calendar and the historical outline into which later generations have fitted their idea of the story of Jesus.

The author is not named in either volume. According to a Church tradition, first attested by Irenaeus ( AD), he was the Luke named as a companion of Paul in three of the Pauline letters, but "a critical consensus emphasizes the countless contradictions between the account in Acts and the authentic Pauline letters." An example can be seen by comparing Acts' accounts of Paul's conversion (Acts 9:1–31, Acts 22:6–21, and Acts 26:9–23) with Paul's own statement that he remained unknown to Christians in Judea after that event (Galatians 1:17–24). The author of the Gospel of Luke clearly admired Paul, but his theology was significantly different from Paul's on key points and he does not (in Acts) represent Paul's views accurately. He was educated, a man of means, probably urban, and someone who respected manual work, although not a worker himself; this is significant, because more high-brow writers of the time looked down on the artisans and small business-people who made up the early church of Paul and were presumably Luke's audience.

The eclipse of the traditional attribution to Luke the companion of Paul has meant that an early date for the gospel is now rarely put forward. Most scholars date the composition of the combined work to around 80–90 AD, although some others suggest 90–110, and there is textual evidence (the conflicts between Western and Alexandrian manuscript families) that Luke–Acts was still being substantially revised well into the 2nd century.

Genre, models and sources

Luke–Acts is a religio-political history of the founder of the church and his successors, in both deeds and words. The author describes his book as a "narrative", rather than as a gospel, and implicitly criticises his predecessors for not giving their readers the speeches of Jesus and the Apostles, as such speeches were the mark of a "full" report, the vehicle through which ancient historians conveyed the meaning of their narratives. He seems to have taken as his model the works of two respected Classical authors, Dionysius of Halicarnassus, who wrote a history of Rome (Roman Antiquities), and the Jewish historian Josephus, author of a history of the Jews (Antiquities of the Jews). All three authors anchor the histories of their respective peoples by dating the births of the founders (Romulus, Moses, and Jesus) and narrate the stories of the founders' births from God, so that they are sons of God. Each founder taught authoritatively, appeared to witnesses after death, and ascended to heaven. Crucial aspects of the teaching of all three concerned the relationship between rich and poor and the question of whether "foreigners" were to be received into the people.

Mark, written around 70 AD, provided the narrative outline for Luke, but Mark contains comparatively little of Jesus' teachings, and for these Luke likely turned to a collection of sayings called Q source, which would have consisted mostly, although not exclusively, of "sayings". Mark and Q account for about 64% of Luke; the remaining material, known as the L source, is of unknown origin and date. Most Q and L-source material is grouped in two clusters, Luke 6:17–8:3 and 9:51–18:14, and L-source material forms the first two sections of the gospel (the preface and infancy and childhood narratives).

Audience and authorial intent
Luke was written to be read aloud to a group of Jesus-followers gathered in a house to share the Lord's Supper. The author assumes an educated Greek-speaking audience, but directs his attention to specifically Christian concerns rather than to the Greco-Roman world at large. He begins his gospel with a preface addressed to "Theophilus": the name means "Lover of God," and could refer to any Christian, though most interpreters consider it a reference to a Christian convert and Luke's literary patron. Here he informs Theophilus of his intention, which is to lead his reader to certainty through an orderly account "of the events that have been fulfilled among us." He did not, however, intend to provide Theophilus with a historical justification of the Christian faith – "did it happen?" – but to encourage faith – "what happened, and what does it all mean?"

Structure and content

Structure
Following the author's preface addressed to his patron and the two birth narratives (John the Baptist and Jesus), the gospel opens in Galilee and moves gradually to its climax in Jerusalem:
 A brief preface addressed to Theophilus stating the author's aims;
 Birth and infancy narratives for both Jesus and John the Baptist, interpreted as the dawn of the promised era of Israel's salvation;
 Preparation for Jesus' messianic mission: John's prophetic mission, his baptism of Jesus, and the testing of Jesus' vocation;
 The beginning of Jesus' mission in Galilee, and the hostile reception there;
 The central section: the journey to Jerusalem, where Jesus knows he must meet his destiny as God's prophet and Messiah;
 His mission in Jerusalem, culminating in confrontation with the leaders of the Jewish Temple;
 His last supper with his most intimate followers, followed by his arrest, interrogation, and crucifixion;
 God's validation of Jesus as Christ: events from the first Easter to the Ascension, showing Jesus' death to be divinely ordained, in keeping with both scriptural promise and the nature of messiahship, and anticipating the story of Acts.

Parallel structure of Luke–Acts
The structure of Acts parallels the structure of the gospel, demonstrating the universality of the divine plan and the shift of authority from Jerusalem to Rome:

The gospel – the acts of Jesus:
 The presentation of the child Jesus at the Temple in Jerusalem
 Jesus' forty days in the desert
 Jesus in Samaria/Judea
 Jesus in the Decapolis
 Jesus receives the Holy Spirit
 Jesus preaches with power (the power of the spirit)
 Jesus heals the sick
 Death of Jesus
 The apostles are sent to preach to all nations
The acts of the apostles:
 Jerusalem
 Forty days before the Ascension
 Samaria
 Asia Minor
 Pentecost: Christ's followers receive the spirit
 The apostles preach with the power of the spirit
 The apostles heal the sick
 Death of Stephen, the first martyr for Christ
 Paul preaches in Rome

Theology

Luke's "salvation history"
Luke's theology is expressed primarily through his overarching plot, the way scenes, themes and characters combine to construct his specific worldview. His "salvation history" stretches from the Creation to the present time of his readers, in three ages: first, the time of "the Law and the Prophets", the period beginning with Genesis and ending with the appearance of John the Baptist; second, the epoch of Jesus, in which the Kingdom of God was preached; and finally the period of the Church, which began when the risen Christ was taken into Heaven, and would end with his second coming.

Christology
Luke's understanding of Jesus – his Christology – is central to his theology. One approach to this is through the titles Luke gives to Jesus: these include, but are not limited to, Christ (Messiah), Lord, Son of God, and Son of Man. Another is by reading Luke in the context of similar Greco-Roman divine saviour figures (Roman emperors are an example), references which would have made clear to Luke's readers that Jesus was the greatest of all saviours. A third is to approach Luke through his use of the Old Testament, those passages from Jewish scripture which he cites to establish that Jesus is the promised Messiah. While much of this is familiar, much also is missing: for example, Luke makes no clear reference to Christ's pre-existence or to the Christian's union with Christ, and makes relatively little reference to the concept of atonement: perhaps he felt no need to mention these ideas, or disagreed with them, or possibly he was simply unaware of them.

Even what Luke does say about Christ is ambiguous or even contradictory. For example, according to Luke 2:11 Jesus was the Christ at his birth, but in Acts 2:36 he becomes Christ at the resurrection, while in Acts 3:20 it seems his messiahship is active only at the parousia, the "second coming"; similarly, in Luke 2:11 he is the Saviour from birth, but in Acts 5:31 he is made Saviour at the resurrection; and he is born the Son of God in Luke 1:32–35, but becomes the Son of God at the resurrection according to Acts 13:33. Many of these differences may be due to scribal error, but others were deliberate alterations to doctrinally unacceptable passages, or the introduction by scribes of "proofs" for their favourite theological tenets. An important example of such deliberate alterations is found in Luke's account of the baptism of Jesus, where virtually all the earliest witnesses have God saying, "This day I have begotten you." (Luke has taken the words of God from Psalm 2, an ancient royal adoption formula in which the king of Israel was recognised as God's elect.) This reading is theologically difficult, as it implies that God is now conferring status on Jesus that he did not previously hold. It is unlikely, therefore, that the more common reading of Luke 3:22 (God says to Jesus, "You are my beloved son, with you I am well pleased") is original.

The Holy Spirit, the Christian community, and the Kingdom of God
The Holy Spirit plays a more important role in Luke–Acts than in the other gospels. Some scholars have argued that the Spirit's involvement in the career of Jesus is paradigmatic of the universal Christian experience, others that Luke's intention was to stress Jesus' uniqueness as the Prophet of the final age. It is clear, however, that Luke understands the enabling power of the Spirit, expressed through non-discriminatory fellowship ("All who believed were together and had all things in common"), to be the basis of the Christian community. This community can also be understood as the Kingdom of God, although the kingdom's final consummation will not be seen till the Son of Man comes "on a cloud" at the end-time.

Christians vs. Rome and the Jews

Luke needed to define the position of Christians in relation to two political and social entities, the Roman Empire and Judaism. Regarding the Empire, Luke makes clear that, while Christians are not a threat to the established order, the rulers of this world hold their power from Satan, and the essential loyalty of Christ's followers is to God and this world will be the kingdom of God, ruled by Christ the King. Regarding the Jews, Luke emphasises the fact that Jesus and all his earliest followers were Jews, although by his time the majority of Christ-followers were gentiles; nevertheless, the Jews had rejected and killed the Messiah, and the Christian mission now lay with the gentiles.

Comparison with other writings

Synoptics
The gospels of Matthew, Mark and Luke share so much in common that they are called the Synoptics, as they frequently cover the same events in similar and sometimes identical language. The majority opinion among scholars is that Mark was the earliest of the three (about 70 AD) and that Matthew and Luke both used this work and the "sayings gospel" known as Q as their basic sources. Luke has both expanded Mark and refined his grammar and syntax, as Mark's Greek writing is less elegant. Some passages from Mark he has eliminated entirely, notably most of chapters 6 and 7, which he apparently felt reflected poorly on the disciples and painted Jesus too much like a magician. Despite this, he follows Mark's narrative more faithfully than does Matthew.

The Gospel of John
Despite being grouped with Matthew and Mark, the Gospel of Luke has a number of parallels with the Gospel of John which are not shared by the other Synoptics:
 Luke uses the terms "Jews" and "Israelites" in a way unlike Mark, but like John.
 Both gospels have characters named Mary of Bethany, Martha, and Lazarus, although John's Lazarus is portrayed as a real person, while Luke's is a figure in a parable.
 At Jesus' arrest, only Luke and John state that the servant's  ear was cut off.
There are also several other parallels that scholars have identified. Recently, some scholars have proposed that the author of John's gospel may have specifically redacted and responded to the Gospel of Luke.

The Gospel of Marcion

Some time in the 2nd century, the Christian thinker Marcion of Sinope began using a gospel that was very similar to, but shorter than, canonical Luke. Marcion was well-known for preaching that the god who sent Jesus into the world was a different, higher deity than the creator god of Judaism.

While no manuscript copies of Marcion's gospel survive, reconstructions of his text have been published by Adolf von Harnack and Dieter T. Roth, based on quotations in the anti-Marcionite treatises of orthodox Christian apologists, such as Irenaeus, Tertullian, and Epiphanius. These early apologists accused Marcion of having "mutilated" canonical Luke by removing material that contradicted his unorthodox theological views. According to Tertullian, Marcion also accused his orthodox opponents of having "falsified" canonical Luke.

Like the Gospel of Mark, Marcion's gospel lacked any nativity story, and Luke's account of the baptism of Jesus was absent. The Gospel of Marcion also omitted Luke's parables of the Good Samaritan and the Prodigal Son.

See also
 Authorship of Luke–Acts
 List of Gospels
 List of omitted Bible verses
 Marcion
 Order of St. Luke
 Synoptic Gospels
 Synoptic problem
 Textual variants in the Gospel of Luke

Notes

References

Citations

Sources

External links 
 

 Bible Gateway 35 languages/50 versions at GospelCom.net
 Unbound Bible 100+ languages/versions at Biola University
 Online Bible at gospelhall.org
 Early Christian Writings; Gospel of Luke: introductions and e-texts
 French; English translation
  Various versions
 A Brief Introduction to Luke–Acts is available online.
 B.H. Streeter, The Four Gospels: A study of origins 1924.
 Willker, W (2007), A textual commentary on the Gospel of Luke, Pub. on-line A very detailed text-critical discussion of the 300 most important variants of the Greek text (PDF, 467 pages)

 
Luke
Texts in Koine Greek
Works of uncertain authorship
Synoptic Gospels